John Peake may refer to:
 John Peake (field hockey) (1924–2022), English field hockey player
 John Peake (game designer), game designer